Mary Pirie (20 January 1822 – 8 February 1885) was a Scottish botanist and teacher.

Biography 
Pirie was born in Aberdeen on 20 January 1822. The house Pirie was born in was Cotton Lodge. Her parents were Clementina Anderson and William Pirie, who was a carpet manufacturer. She was one of ten children. The family moved to Portsoy in 1840, which is where Pirie died on 8 February 1885.

Career 
Pirie was a botanist who wanted to inspire that love in others, both her works are aimed at encouraging people from all walks of life to be interested in nature. This concern with science, and botany in particular, to be a public pursuit meant that she wrote a regular column about nature in The Banffshire Reporter.

Pirie's 1860 popular botanical work was described as "a beautiful book for a present". It includes her own poetry and illustrations. One example of Pirie's style is in the details of the romantic story told about the mignonette, reseda odorata and how it became part of the Count Walsheim of Saxony's coat of arms. Pirie's 1864 work was dedicated to Viscount Reidhaven and in the preface she states that it is designed to "encourage and aid youth in the study of animated nature". Her first book was published by James Blackwood & Co; the second by Lewis Smith.

In later life she lived in Portsoy, where she ran a private school, on Old Cullen Street. The success of this school led directly to the establishment of Durn Road School, however, due to ill-health she was unable to teach there. She died in Portsoy on 8 February 1885. Her remains were interred in St Nicholas Cemetery in Aberdeen. Her obituary described her as a "highly educated", as well as being active in the Dorcas Society of Portsoy and a member of St John's Church. She was the last remaining member of her family.

Books 
1860 - Flowers, Grasses and Shrubs with Anecdotes and Poetical Illustrations.

1864 - Familiar Teachings on Natural History: A Book for the Use of Schools and Families

References 

1822 births
1885 deaths
Women botanists
People from Aberdeen
19th-century women scientists
19th-century women writers